The British Swimming Championships - 800 metres freestyle winners formerly the (Amateur Swimming Association (ASA) National Championships) are listed below.

The event was originally contested over 880 yards and then switched to the metric conversion of 800 metres in 1971. Throughout much of the history of the event it was contested by women only because the men competed in the 1,500 metres freestyle.

800 metres freestyle champions

See also
British Swimming
List of British Swimming Championships champions

References

Swimming in the United Kingdom